The 2011 European Ladies' Team Championship took place 5–9 July at Golf Club Murhof in Frohnleiten, Austria. It was the 29th women's golf amateur European Ladies' Team Championship.

Venue 
The club was founded in 1963 and its course, located 15 kilometers north of Graz in Styria, Austria, was constructed by Dr. Bernhard von Limburger.

The championship course was set up with par 72.

Format 
All participating teams played two qualification rounds of stroke-play with six players, counted the five best scores for each team.

The eight best teams formed flight A, in knock-out match-play over the next three days. The teams were seeded based on their positions after the stroke-play. The first placed team was drawn to play the quarter final against the eight placed team, the second against the seventh, the third against the sixth and the fourth against the fifth. In each match between two nation teams, two 18-hole foursome games and five 18-hole single games were played. Teams were allowed to switch players during the team matches, selecting other players in to the afternoon single games after the morning foursome games. Teams knocked out after the quarter finals played one foursome game and four single games in each of their remaining matches. Games all square after 18 holes were declared halved, if the team match was already decided.

The eight teams placed 9–16 in the qualification stroke-play formed flight B, to play similar knock-out match-play, with one foursome game and four single games, to decide their final positions.

The four teams placed 17–20 in the qualification stroke-play formed flight C, to meet each other, with one foursome game and four single games, to decide their final positions.

Teams 
A record number of 20 nation teams contested the event. Each team consisted of six players. Russia took part for the first time.

Players in the teams

Winners 
2009 champions Germany lead  the opening 36-hole qualifying competition, with a score of 15 under par 705, two strokes ahead of host team Denmark.

Individual leader in the 36-hole stroke-play competition was Leona Maguire, Ireland, with a score of 8 under par 136, one stroke ahead of nearest competitors

Defending champions Sweden won the championship, beating Spain 5–2 in the final and earned their seventh title.

Germany earned third place, beating Belgium 4–3 in the bronze match.

Results 
Qualification round

Team standings

* Note: In the event of a tie the order was determined by the better total non-counting scores.

Individual leaders

 Note: There was no official award for the lowest individual score.

Flight A

Bracket

Final games

* Note: Game declared halved, since team match already decided.

Flight B

Bracket

Flight C

Team matches

Team standings

Final standings

Sources:

See also 
 Espirito Santo Trophy – biennial world amateur team golf championship for women organized by the International Golf Federation.
 European Amateur Team Championship – European amateur team golf championship for men organised by the European Golf Association.
 European Ladies Amateur Championship – European amateur individual golf championship for women organised by the European Golf Association.

References

External links 
 European Golf Association: Results

European Ladies' Team Championship
Golf tournaments in Austria
European Ladies' Team Championship
European Ladies' Team Championship
European Ladies' Team Championship